Superstition Springs Center is a shopping mall located in Mesa, Arizona. It is owned by Macerich, and was developed by Westcor. The anchors at the mall are Dillard's, JCPenney, and Macy's. The mall also has Picture Show as a junior anchor and a freestanding Cheesecake Factory. The mall features an outdoor amphitheatre and a fountain that converts into a stage featuring free concerts from May to August on Saturday evenings. The mall also serves as a transit center for Valley Metro Bus.

History
Superstition Springs Center was built and completed in 1990, and was jointly developed and owned by Westcor and General Growth Properties. The original architect was Rafique Islam. The Weitz Company, Inc. was the general contractor. When it first opened, most of the area surrounding the mall was open fields.  At the time, it rested at the end of a freeway (U.S. Route 60), and was considered too far away from developed areas to be successful.  However, since its opening, the area around Superstition Springs Center has seen significant growth; as of 2009, it held an estimated population of 337,000 in its primary trade area.

In February 2002, the mall underwent remodeling to include exterior paint and lighting, interior paint, flooring, and lighting to create a new refined atmosphere with color, texture, and regional imagery.

Originally majority-owned and managed by Westcor (two-thirds share, with General Growth Properties owning the other third), in 2002 Superstition Springs Center became part of Macerich's portfolio, with Westcor kept as management. In June 2011, GGP sold its 1/3 ownership in the mall (along with its 1/3 ownership of Arrowhead Towne Center in Glendale), with Westcor assuming full ownership.

In recent years this mall has experienced additional growth with the addition of Ross Dress For less & Ulta Beauty into the former Sports Authority.

Anchors 
The anchors at the mall are Dillard's, JCPenney, and Macy's. 

The Macy's location was built to be Broadway Southwest (the last store built by then owner Carter Hawley Hale). This location was halted during a hostile take over attempt by the Limited and sold off to Robinsons-May in 1994.

In 2010, the former Mervyn's became a furniture store called Home Sleep Home, which went out of business. It was then divided up into two junior anchors. The lower level was replaced with a miniature golf course called Lunar Mini Golf and later Phoenix Sofa Factory. Phoenix Sofa Factory closed in October 2017, leaving the lower level vacant.  The upper level became Sports Authority, which went out of business in 2016, and became Book Vault a year later. Book Vault closed on October 28, 2018, with Ross filling the space in 2019.

On October 16, 2018, It was announced Sears would shutter as part of an ongoing plan to phase out of brick-and-mortar. Several prospective tenants have been in discussion. Part of the former auto center is expected to become Blink Fitness.

References

External links 
 Superstition Springs Center Official website

Macerich
Shopping malls in Maricopa County, Arizona
Buildings and structures in Mesa, Arizona
Shopping malls established in 1990
1990 establishments in Arizona